Weerasinghe is a surname. Notable people with the surname include:

Anoja Weerasinghe (born 1955), Sri Lankan actress
Asoka Weerasinghe, Canadian government official
Bertram Weerasinghe (1904–1971), Ceylonese engineer and firefighter
Chalanaka Weerasinghe (born 1994), Sri Lankan cricketer
D. Weerasingha (born 1979), Sri Lankan politician
Dhansiri Weerasinghe (died 2020), Sri Lankan cricketer
Jagath Weerasinghe (born 1954), Sri Lankan contemporary artist and archeologist
Jayantha Weerasinghe (born 1950), Sri Lankan politician
L. A. Weerasinghe, Sri Lankan auditor general
Oliver Weerasinghe (1907–1980), Sri Lankan architect and diplomat
Rajeewa Weerasinghe (born 1987), Sri Lankan cricketer
Rohana Weerasinghe (born 1949), Sri Lankan musician, composer and singer
Saman Weerasinghe (born 1961), Sri Lankan physician, diplomat and businessman
Sanjeewa Weerasinghe (born 1968), Sri Lankan cricketer
Sehan Weerasinghe (born 1995), Sri Lankan cricketer
Suraj Weerasinghe (born 1996), Sri Lankan cricketer
Weerasumana Weerasinghe (born 1975), Sri Lankan politician

Sinhalese surnames